William Cuffe  was an Irish politician.

Cuffe  was educated at  Trinity College, Dublin.

Cuffe  represented Kilkenny City from 1735 to 1743.

References

Irish MPs 1783–1790
Irish MPs 1790–1797
Members of the Parliament of Ireland (pre-1801) for County Kilkenny constituencies
18th-century Irish people
Alumni of Trinity College Dublin